Benjamin (Ben) John Barker (born 10 March 1988 in Truro, Cornwall) is a British speedway rider.

Career summary 

Barker signed for Stoke Potters in December 2006 after impressing for the Stoke club's Conference League side, Stoke Spitfires. In October 2006, Barker finished in third place in the British Under-18 Championship. In April 2007, a month after his 19th birthday, he reached the final of the British Under-21 Championship, finishing fourth.

Barker represented Great Britain at Under-21 level, at the 2006 Team Speedway Junior World Championship. He also competed in the 2007 Individual Speedway Junior World Championship finishing seventh in Qualifying Round B at Goričan on 12 May 2007, before going out of the competition on 17 June in Semi Final B at Daugavpils, where he finished 14th.

Barker returned to the Coventry Bees in the 2008 Elite League, after riding for the Coventry Cougars in the Conference Trophy during the 2004 season. In July 2008, he agreed a permanent move to the Bees as a full asset, and returned to them for the 2009 and 2010 seasons. He continued to ride in the top two tiers of British speedway riding for various clubs. In 2014 Barker rode for Plymouth Devils then in 2015 he signed for Berwick Bandits but a back injury at the British Final at Wolverhampton looked set to end his season but he returned to ride for Peterborough Panthers at the end of the 2015 season. In 2016 Ben signed for Glasgow Tigers in the Premier League. He rode for Redcar Bears in 2018. After ten years as a Coventry asset, Ben Barker was awarded a testimonial meeting to be held at his current club Redcar on 23 March 2019.

In 2022, he rode for the Ipswich in the SGB Premiership 2022 and for Plymouth in the SGB Championship 2022. His 2022 season was curtailed after he failed a random drug test before a race meeting. Although the Speedway Control Bureau have not released the details, his club Plymouth stated that the test showed positive for a strong dosage of co-codamol and Zapain. In 2023, he re-signed for Plymouth for the SGB Championship 2023 following his return after a suspension.

Career details

World Championships 
 Individual U-21 World Championship
 2007 - 14th place in Semi-final 2
 2008 - 10th place in Qualifying Round 5
 2009 - injury in Qualifying Round 1 and was replaced in Semi-Final 1
 Team U-21 World Championship (Under-21 Speedway World Cup)
 2006 - 3rd place in Qualifying Round 1
 2007 - started in Qualifying Round 2 only
 2008 - 3rd place in Qualifying Round 1

References 

1988 births
Living people
English motorcycle racers
Sportspeople from Truro
British speedway riders
Berwick Bandits riders
Birmingham Brummies riders
Coventry Bees riders
Exeter Falcons riders
Ipswich Witches riders
King's Lynn Stars riders
Newcastle Diamonds riders
Oxford Cheetahs riders
Peterborough Panthers riders
Plymouth Devils riders
Plymouth Gladiators speedway riders
Redcar Bears riders
Rye House Rockets riders
Scunthorpe Scorpions riders
Somerset Rebels riders
Stoke Potters riders
Trelawny Tigers riders